Samuel Edem was a former Nigerian ambassador and a former Chairman of the Niger Delta Development Commission (NDDC). He hails from Ndiya, Nsit Ubium Akwa Ibom State in southern Nigeria.

References 
 THANKSGIVING SERVICE IN HONOUR OF HON. (PASTOR) GODWIN MOFFAT EYO. NDDC COMMISSIONER REPRESENTING AKWA IBOM STATE ON MAY 22, 2005

Living people
Year of birth missing (living people)
People from Akwa Ibom State